Narayani Zone was one of the fourteen zones of Nepal, comprising five districts, namely, Bara, Chitwan, Makwanpur, Parsa and Rautahat. Here is district wise List of Monuments which is in the Narayani Zone.

Narayani Zone
 List of monuments in Bara District 
 List of monuments in Chitwan District 
 List of monuments in Makwanpur District 
 List of monuments in Parsa District 
 List of monuments in Rautahat District

References

Narayani Zone
Narayani Zone